The List of Liliaceae genera has been much reduced by modern molecular phylogenetic based taxonomy. The current taxonomy of Liliaceae treats the family Liliaceae as having three subfamilies, with the Liliodeae being further subdivided into two tribes, the Medeoleae and Lilieae. The family Liliaceae consists of fifteen genera and approximately 600 species in all.

List of genera by subfamilial divisions

References

Bibliography 

 
 
 

 01
Liliaceae
Liliaceae
.